Ctenuchidia subcyanea is a moth of the subfamily Arctiinae. It was described by Francis Walker in 1854. It is found on Hispaniola.

References

Arctiinae
Moths described in 1854